Ayanna Alexander is a track and field athlete from Trinidad and Tobago who is the first and only women in the country's history to compete at an Olympic games in the women's triple jump. Ayanna competes primarily in the triple jump and some times the long jump. She competed in track and field collegiately in the United States at Louisiana Tech University and at McLean High School in McLean, VA. She is the Trinidad and Tobago national record holder in the triple jump at 14.40 meters. and is the first and only athlete from Trinidad and Tobago to qualify in the triple jump for the Olympic Games.

Personal bests

Competition record

References

External links

1982 births
Living people
Trinidad and Tobago female triple jumpers
Athletes (track and field) at the 2007 Pan American Games
Athletes (track and field) at the 2011 Pan American Games
Athletes (track and field) at the 2015 Pan American Games
Pan American Games competitors for Trinidad and Tobago
Athletes (track and field) at the 2012 Summer Olympics
Olympic athletes of Trinidad and Tobago
Louisiana Tech University alumni
Athletes (track and field) at the 2010 Commonwealth Games
Athletes (track and field) at the 2014 Commonwealth Games
Athletes (track and field) at the 2018 Commonwealth Games
Sportspeople from Port of Spain
Trinidad and Tobago female athletes
Commonwealth Games silver medallists for Trinidad and Tobago
Commonwealth Games medallists in athletics
Central American and Caribbean Games bronze medalists for Trinidad and Tobago
Competitors at the 2010 Central American and Caribbean Games
Competitors at the 2014 Central American and Caribbean Games
Competitors at the 2018 Central American and Caribbean Games
Central American and Caribbean Games medalists in athletics
Medallists at the 2010 Commonwealth Games
Medallists at the 2014 Commonwealth Games